Letícia Oro Melo (born 5 October 1997 in Joinville) is a Brazilian athlete who competes in track and field. Melo won the bronze medal in the long jump at the 2022 World Athletics Championships. Prior to this, Melo won the 2021 South American Championships in long jump and the title at the Brazilian national championships in 2022.

Career
In 2012, after competing primarily in sprint events on the track, such as 100 m and 200 m, she entered the list of jumpers at the Santa Catarina state championships, where she eventually won the competition and set a new championship record of 5.59 metres.

She was South American under-18 champion in 2014 and under-20 champion in 2015.

Melo won the long jump at the 2021 South American Championships in Athletics with a new personal best jump of 6.63 metres.

She had a serious knee injury, suffered in December 2021, when she tore her cruciate ligament and was out of competition for seven months. On 27 June 2022, her return were the Brazil national championships, where she was champion of the tournament, and was selected for the 2022 World Athletics Championships.

At the World Athletics Championships in July 2022 in Eugene, Oregon, she made it to the final with her last jump of the qualifying trials, with 6.64 metres it was also a new personal best. Melo had faulted on her two previous jumps, and the jump pipped the American Jasmine Moore by 3 centimetres. In the final, she won the bronze medal with a jump of 6.89 metres, just one centimetre further than the fourth placed Burks from the United States. Melo set the mark with her first attempt and attempted 7 metres in the following ones, burning all the remaining attempts and approaching 7 metres in a few of those invalid jumps. Nonetheless, she surpassed the best jump of her career by 25 centimetres to obtain the bronze. It was the first medal of a Brazilian in the history of this event at World Championships.

Personal bests
Long Jump: 6.89 (wind: +1.1 m/s) –  Eugene, 24 July 2022

All information from World Athletics profile.

References

1997 births
Living people
South American Games gold medalists for Brazil
South American Games medalists in athletics
World Athletics Championships athletes for Brazil
World Athletics Championships medalists
Brazilian female long jumpers
20th-century Brazilian women
21st-century Brazilian women